Madeline Yale Wynne (September 25, 1847 − January 4, 1918) was an American artist, teacher, writer, and philanthropist.

Life
Madeline was born in Newport, New York, the daughter of Linus Yale, Jr., and Katherine (Catherine) Brooks. Her brothers were John Brooks Yale and Julian Yale, both members of the Union League of New York. 
Her brother John was married to Marie Louise, daughter of U.S. Secretary Hugh McCulloch, who was the main financier of the American Civil War for Abraham Lincoln. In 1865, when she was 18, Madeline  married to Senator Henry Winn, son of Senator Reuben Winn. Henry Winn was a graduate from Yale, then Harvard, and had been previously Major during the Civil War, assistant Attorney General, then personal Secretary to Senator George Sumner, before becoming Senator, and his father was a postmaster. 

The couple had two sons—Philip Henry, born January 17, 1868, and Sydney Yale, born September 6, 1870—but the marriage came to an end in 1874. Sydney Yale Wynne (1870-1915), was one of the first Doctors of West Point, New York. He graduated from Harvard and was the grandfather of Lieutenant Colonel Theodore Fite, son of Colonel John H. Fite. Following her divorce, she changed the spelling of her last name to Wynne.

In the early 1860s, her husband, Senator Winn, founded with his in-laws Linus Yale Jr. and John Brooks Yale, the Yale & Winn Manufacturing Company, which became a successful enterprise, and received an award from Napoleon III's Universal Exposition of Paris in 1867. He tried to do business in South America, but his venture proved unsuccessful, and his ship the Caribbean was wrecked in the ocean and insured. He later established a law practice in Massachusetts when he became Senator.

Having been schooled in the technical arts by her father, Madeline studied painting at the Museum of Fine Arts, Boston during 1877−1878, at the Art Students League of New York in early 1880, and later in Europe. In the fall of 1880, she went on a tour to Europe, visiting Athens, Florence, Madrid, Paris, Venice, and Vienna, meeting with French painter Thomas Couture. While in Athens, she sketched the Acropolis, and was invited to dine with German archeologist Heinrich Schliemann, but could not attend. During the 1880s, while visiting Florence, she also met painter Frank Duveneck and fellow craftsman Annie Cabot Putnam, of the Cabot and Putnam family. The two became lifelong partners, initially sharing a studio in Boston.

After having been a resident of Shelburne Falls for most of her adult life, in 1885, Madeline began spending her summers with Annie at the village of Deerfield, Massachusetts. Assisted by her son Philip, she worked with Annie to restore and refurbish the historic Willard House, which they dubbed the "Manse". This 1768 Georgian mansion was the former home of the Reverend Samuel Willard.

In 1895, she turned to writing; Madeline's supernatural short story "The Little Room" was published in Harper's Magazine and was well received. It was later released in a collection of Wynne's short stories called The Little Room and Other Stories, along with The Sequel to the Little Room. (More recently, "The Little Room" appeared in the 2009 horror compendium, American Fantastic Tales, edited by Peter Straub.) She wrote for Atlantic Monthly, Harper's Monthly, Home Beautiful, and various other publications.

Madeline helped to found and lead the Deerfield Society of Arts and Crafts in 1901, which became an umbrella organization for the arts movement in the village. Wynne served as the curator as the movement produced a broad array of artistry, including jewelry, photography, weaving, basketry, rugs, and furniture. She and Annie became very influential in developing arts and crafts in the community, with Madeline organizing tours of the village's craftwork and arranging speaking engagements. The two women were expert metal smiths in their own right.

References

1847 births
1918 deaths
19th-century American artists
American women short story writers
19th-century American women artists
19th-century American women writers
20th-century American artists
20th-century American women writers
20th-century American women artists
People from Newport, New York
Writers from New York (state)
School of the Museum of Fine Arts at Tufts alumni
Art Students League of New York alumni
19th-century American short story writers
20th-century American short story writers
People from Shelburne Falls, Massachusetts